Martine is a feminine given name and a surname.

Given name
 Martine Aubry (born 1950), French politician
 Martine Audet (born 1961), Canadian poet
 Martine Aurillac (born 1939), French politician
 Martine Baay-Timmerman (born 1958), Dutch politician
 Martine Bartlett (1925–2006), American actress
 Martine Batchelor (born 1953), author and former Buddhist nun
 Martine Beaugrand, Canadian politician
 Martine Bellen, American poet, editor and librettist
 Martine Bercher (1944–2005), American football player
 Martine Bertereau (c. 1600–after 1642), pioneering French woman mining engineer and mineralogist, also known as Baroness de Beausoleil
 Martine Berthet (born 1961), French politician
 Martine Beswick (born 1941), English actress and model
 Martine Beugnet, French film theorist
 Martine Billard (born 1952), French politician
 Martine Brunschwig Graf (born 1950), Swiss politician
 Martine Buron (born 1944), French architect and politician
 Martine Carol (1920–1967), French actress
 Martine Carrillon-Couvreur (born 1948). French politician
 Martine Coulombe, Canadian politician first elected in 2010
 Martine Croxall (born 1969), British journalist and television news presenter
 Martine Dennis (born 1961), a BBC news anchor
 Martine Djibo (died 2022), Ivorian educator and politician
 Martine Etienne (born 1956), French politician
 Martine Faure (born 1948), French politician
 Martine Franck (1938–2012), Belgian photographer
 Martine Gaillard (born 1971), Canadian television sportscaster
 Martine L. Jacquot (born 1955), French-born Canadian academic, novelist, poet, short story writer, journalist
 Martine Janssen (born 1977), Dutch former swimmer
 Martine Kempf, French scientist
 Martine Le Moignan (born 1962), English former professional squash player
 Martine Leavitt, American-Canadian author of young adult novels
Martine Leguille-Balloy (born 1957), French politician
 Martine Lignières-Cassou (born 1952), French politician
 Martine Locke, Australian singer, songwriter and guitarist
 Martine Martinel (born 1953), French politician
 Martine McCutcheon (born 1976), English singer, television personality and actress
 Martine Murray (born 1965), Australian author and illustrator
Martine Nida-Rümelin (born 1957), German philosopher
 Martine Ohr (born 1964), Dutch former field hockey striker
 Martine Ouellet, Canadian politician first elected in 2010
 Martine Patenaude (born 1974), Canadian former ice dancer
 Martine Piccart (born 1953), Belgian medical doctor, professor and President of the European Organisation for Research and Treatment of Cancer
 Martine Pinville (born 1958), French politician
Martine Reicherts (born 1957), Luxembourgian politician
 Martine Rothblatt (born 1954 as Martin Rothblatt), American transgender lawyer, author and entrepreneur
 Martine Roure (born 1948), French politician
 Martine St. Clair (born 1962), Canadian singer
 Martine Syms (born 1988), American artist
Martine Taelman (born 1965), Belgian politician
 Martine van Hamel (born 1945), Dutch prima ballerina
 Martine Vassal (born 1962), French politician
 Martine Vik Magnussen, (1985-2008), Norwegian student murdered in London, England
Martine Wolff (born 1996), Norwegian handball player
Martine Wonner (born 1964), French politician
 Martine Zuiderwijk (born 1984), Dutch former figure skater

Surname
 George Martine (historian) (1635–1712), Scottish historian
 George Martine (physician) (1700–1741), Scottish physician
 James Edgar Martine (1850-1925), American politician and US Senator from New Jersey
 Layng Martine Jr., American country music singer and songwriter
 Randolph B. Martine (1844–1895), American lawyer and politician
 Stéphane Martine (born 1978), French footballer
 Tucker Martine (born 1972), American record producer, musician and composer

Fictional characters
Martine (character), main character of a series of French books for children 
Martine Gabrielle de Polignac (Lady Oscar), in the shōjo manga/anime The Rose of Versailles

See also
Alphonse de Lamartine
Martin (disambiguation)
Martyn (disambiguation)

Feminine given names
French feminine given names
Norwegian feminine given names